Theo Keating, also known as Fake Blood and Touché, is an English DJ, musician and music producer who made his name as one half of the Wiseguys, a British hip hop/big beat group, together with Paul Eve. Some of their best-known songs are "Start the Commotion" and "Ooh La La" (not to be confused with the Goldfrapp song of the same name), which were used in commercials for Mitsubishi and Budweiser, respectively. Keating's current project is a duo called the Black Ghosts where he performs with Simon William Lord, formerly a founding member of rock band Simian.

Keating is also a popular house and electro DJ and producer, under the name Fake Blood. He has released several successful productions and remixes as Fake Blood, including his 2009 release "I Think I Like It". In 2009, Fake Blood featured on an episode of BBC Radio 1's Essential Mix.

In May 2012, Fake Blood announced plans on his Facebook page about a new 3-track EP. Later, in July 2012, he stated that the album Cells would be released in the autumn. It featured brand new tracks and its first single, "Yes/No" was released in August as an EP, followed up by the second single "All in the Blink" later in the year.

The full-length album Cells was officially released in September 2012.

Discography

Albums

Compilations

Extended plays

Singles

Remixes

References

External links
 Fake Blood's March 2009 Essential Mix

Living people
Big beat musicians
Club DJs
English dance musicians
English DJs
English electronic musicians
English record producers
Remixers
Year of birth missing (living people)
Electronic dance music DJs